The 1978 New York gubernatorial election was held on November 7, 1978 to elect the Governor and Lieutenant Governor of New York. It was the first reelection of a Democratic governor in New York since 1938.

Democratic Primary Results

Results

1978
Gubernatorial
New York
November 1978 events in the United States